Steven Birch (born 25 September 1981, in Whiston) is a light heavyweight boxer from England, who won a silver medal at the 2002 Commonwealth Games in Manchester, United Kingdom.

References
 Profile

1981 births
Living people
People from Whiston, Merseyside
English male boxers
Light-heavyweight boxers
Boxers at the 2002 Commonwealth Games
Commonwealth Games silver medallists for England
Commonwealth Games medallists in boxing
Medallists at the 2002 Commonwealth Games